Hakluyt & Company is a British strategic advisory firm.  The company is headquartered in London and has subsidiary offices in New York, Dallas, San Francisco, Tokyo, Frankfurt, Singapore, Mumbai, Chicago and Sydney.

Hakluyt avoids publicity, but is regarded as having a reputation for discretion and effectiveness among its client base. Hakluyt was founded by former officials of the British Secret Intelligence Service (MI6). The company has recruited several former British spies and journalists from The Financial Times.

The firm is chaired by Paul Deighton, and the other members of the board include managing partner Varun Chandra, Les Fagen, and Jean Tomlin.

Corporate governance
Hakluyt's international advisory board comprises senior figures with backgrounds in business and government. It is chaired by Niall FitzGerald, KBE, former CEO and chairman of Unilever, and its current members are:

M. S. Banga – partner at Clayton, Dubilier & Rice and former chairman and managing director, Hindustan Unilever
John Bell – Regius Professor of Medicine at the University of Oxford
Douglas Flint – chairman, Standard Life Aberdeen
Jurgen Grossmann – founder and shareholder, Georgsmarienhutte Holding GmbH
Muhtar Kent – former CEO and chairman, The Coca-Cola Company
Irene Lee – chairman, Hysan Development Co. Limited
Iain Lobban – former director, UK Government Communications Headquarters (GCHQ)
Trevor Manuel – former minister of finance, South Africa
Lubna Olayan – CEO and deputy chairperson, Olayan Financing Company
Sandi Peterson – former group worldwide chairman, Johnson & Johnson and independent director, Microsoft Corporation
Alfonso Prat-Gay – former minister of the economy and President of the Central Bank of Argentina
John Rose – former chairman, Hakluyt & Company
Shuzo Sumi – former president and chairman, Tokio Marine Holdings and chairman of the board, Sony Corporation
Ambassador Louis Susman – former US ambassador to the UK
Ratan Tata – chairman emeritus, Tata Sons

The former president and chairman of Mitsubishi Corporation, Minoru (Ben) Makihara, served on the advisory board of the firm from 2004 to 2020.

References

External links

Companies based in the City of Westminster
Consulting firms established in 1995
Strategy consulting firms